Julien Bos, (born 18 August 1998) is a French handball player for Montpellier Handball.

References

External links
 Julien Bos at European Handball Federation
 Julien Bos at Ligue nationale de handball

French male handball players
1998 births
Living people
Montpellier Handball players